The 8th Vijay Awards ceremony honouring the best of the Tamil film industry in 2013 was held on 5 July 2014 at Chennai. The event was hosted by Gopinath and Divyadharshini.

Jury 
The jury members were director Prathap K. Pothan, cinematographer Ravi K. Chandran, and Yugi Sethu.

Winners and nominees 
Source:

Jury awards 

Special Jury Awards
 Vijay Sethupathi (Actor)
 Soodhu Kavvum (Film)

Favorite awards

Multiple nominations 

The following eleven films received four nominations or more:

The following seven films received multiple awards:

References

External links 
 

Vijay Awards
2014 Indian film awards